This is a list of seasons played by Carmarthen Town A.F.C. in Welsh and European football, from 1959 (earliest known record) to the end of the last completed season. It details the club's achievements in all major competitions.

Carmarthen Town have won the Welsh Cup once, the Welsh League Cup twice and the Welsh Football League Cup once. They have also qualified for UEFA Cup and UEFA Intertoto Cup on two occasions.

Key

 P = Played
 W = Games won
 D = Games drawn
 L = Games lost
 F = Goals for
 A = Goals against
 Pts = Points
 Pos = Final position

WPL = Welsh Premier League
LoW = League of Wales
Div One = Welsh Football League Division One
Div Two = Welsh Football League Division Two
Div Two(W) = Welsh Football League Division Two West

 F = Final
 SF = Semi-finals
 QF = Quarter-finals
 QR1 = First Qualifying Round
 QR2 = Second Qualifying Round
 Group = Group stage

 R1 = Round 1
 R2 = Round 2
 R3 = Round 3
 R4 = Round 4
 R5 = Round 5

Seasons

Footnotes

References
General

Specific

External links
 
 carmarthentownafc.net Archived club website (1997–2011)
 Carmarthen Town at the Welsh Premier League official website
 Carmarthen Town at the UEFA official website

Seasons
 
Carmarthen Town